Old Sutton High School, also known as Sutton Grade School, was a historic school located at Sutton, Braxton County, West Virginia. It was built in 1906, and was a three-story red brick building.  It measured 68 feet by 64 feet and featured a three-story, truncated entrance tower.  It housed eight classrooms, a full basement, and an auditorium on the third floor.  Rooms had high, pressed tin ceilings.

It was listed on the National Register of Historic Places in 1979, and demolished in 2008.

References

Defunct schools in West Virginia
Demolished buildings and structures in West Virginia
Former school buildings in the United States
National Register of Historic Places in Braxton County, West Virginia
School buildings completed in 1906
Schools in Braxton County, West Virginia
School buildings on the National Register of Historic Places in West Virginia
1906 establishments in West Virginia
Buildings and structures demolished in 2008